Planisphærium is the 2003 debut album from the technical death metal band Wormed.

Track listing
All music composed by J.Oliver and Andy C
All lyrics written by Phlegeton
"Tunnel of Ions" – 3:29
"Geodesic Dome" – 3:39
"Voxel Mitosis" – 3:57
"Fragments" – 0:14
"Ylem" – 3:36
"Planisphaerium" – 4:03
"Pulses in Rhombus Forms" – 3:01
"Dehydrating" – 3:09

2005 Reissue
The reissue includes tracks from Wormed's two previous releases, "Floating Cadaver in the Monochrome Demo" and "Voxel Mitosis Promo"
"Pulses in Rhombus Forms" – 3:04 (1999 Edition)
"Ectoplasmic Iconosphere [D.1]" – 3:58 
"Ectoplasmic Iconosphere [D.2]" – 4:00
"Floating Cadaver in the Monochrome" – 3:04
"Geodesic Dome" – 1:25 (1999 Edition)
"Voxel Mitosis" – 3:56 (2001 Edition)

Personnel

Wormed
Phlegeton – vocals
J. Oliver – guitar
Guillemoth – bass guitar
Andy C – drums

Production credits
Produced by Samuel Ruiz and Wormed
Mastered by Jorge Peñafiel

Additional
Album layout, design and artwork by Phlegeton.

References

2003 albums